Drăganu may refer to one of several entities in Romania:

Drăganu, a commune in Argeș County
Drăganu, a village in Valea Mare Commune, Vâlcea County
Nicolae Drăganu, linguist
Tudor Drăganu, jurist, son of Nicolae

Romanian-language surnames